Jon Robert Cart (born 1964) is an American flutist, piccoloist, and pedagogue.  He is professor of music at Montclair State University’s John J. Cali School of Music and a Verne Q. Powell Flutes Artist.

Early life
Cart was born to Alta and Richard Cart and was raised in Deputy, Indiana. He began studying piano at the age of five with Thelma Henry.  By the age of 14, he had begun playing the flute and studied with Francis Fuge of the Louisville Orchestra.

Studies
He holds the Bachelor of Music in performance from DePauw University, the Master of Music in performance from Indiana University, and the Doctor of Musical Arts in performance from the University of Maryland College Park.

Professional work

He performs with Philadelphia’s Network for New Music. He has performed at Tanglewood, the Atlantic Music Festival, and as solo recitalist at The Kennedy Center and Carnegie Hall, and in China. An advocate for new music, he has premiered solo, chamber, and orchestral works. Solo works by Jennifer Higdon, Gary Schocker, and others have been dedicated to him. As a chamber musician, he is the founding flutist of the Éxi Chéria, a flute viola, and cello chamber ensemble. He serves as a faculty member and flutist and coordinator of the Contemporary Music Ensemble at the Atlantic Music Festival, and as Executive Director of the Marcel Moyse Society.

He has served as Dean of the College of Fine and Performing Arts at Rowan University and as the founding managerial Director of the John J. Cali School of Music at Montclair State University.

Published works
Appoggio and the Art and Science of Bel Canto Flute Pedagogy

Focus! Regulating states of being to improve learning

Serenata Mexicana

Richard Wagner Weseondonck Lieder and Trios Mélodies

References

American flautists
Living people
1964 births
Montclair State University faculty